Markovac Našički is a settlement  in region  Slavonia,  Osijek-Baranja County, near  Našice,  Croatia.
Population is 1,586 (2011).
In Markovac is situated a private Bizik family Zoo. Between Markovac and Nasice is situated an accumulation Lake Lapovac.

Population

References

Našice